France 3 Normandie is one of France 3's regional stations, serving the French region of Normandy.

The station's headquarters, as well as the main broadcasting centre and studios, are located in Rouen. In addition, the station operates two local broadcasting centres with their own television facilities: one in Rouen serves the departments of Seine-Maritime and Eure, the other in Caen serves the departments of Calvados, Manche and Orne.

Two distinctive programmings are broadcast from these centres, this includes two distinct editions of the channel's flagship news bulletins 12/13, 19/20 and Soir 3, prepared by the editorial teams based in Rouen and Caen. A local news bulletin called Baie de Seine, covers Le Havre and the area of the same name. It is produced by a team based in Le Havre. France 3 being known for having the most closely meshed network of news bureaus in France, its station in Normandy is no exception. France 3 Normandie has several crews scattered throughout the region. The bureaus in Dieppe and Évreux are managed by the editor-in-chief based at Rouen's centre, and the bureaus in Alençon, Avranches and Cherbourg-en-Cotentin are managed by the editor-in-chief based at Caen's centre. 

France 3 Normandie also produces entertainment shows in the morning on Mondays, Tuesdays and Thursdays and a political show on Sundays. Also, twice a month, the station aires a magazine scheduled after the nightly news bulletin Soir 3.

Presenters and hosts

At Rouen's Broadcasting Centre
 Angèle de Vecchi
 Marie du Mesnil-Adelée
 Stéphane Gérain 
 Julie Howlett
 Emilie Leconte 
 Frédéric Nicolas
 Magali Nicolin 
 Jean-Baptiste Pattier
 Béatrice Rabelle 
 François Verly

At Caen's Broadcasting Centre
 Franck Besnier
 Franck Bodereau
 Émilie Flahaut
 Simon Le Pape
 Odile Longueval
 Gwénaëlle Louis
 Laurent Marvyle
 Erwan de Miniac
 Aurélie Misery
 Jacques Perrotte
 Louise Pezzoli
 Jérôme Ragueneau
 Sylvain Rouil
 Florent Turpin

Capital
France 3 Normandie has an annual budget of 31.97 million euros.

See also
France 3 Bourgogne

References

External links 
 France 3 Basse-Normandie 
 France 3 Haute-Normandie 
 France 3 Normandie Facebook page
 Free and private local TV channel : NormandieTV http://www.normandie-tv.fr et La Chaine Normande http://www.lachainenormande.fr/

03 Normandie
Television channels and stations established in 1964
Mass media in Caen
Mass media in Rouen